Azraq may refer to:
 Azraq, Abadan
 Azraq, Ahvaz